The Belgian Albums Chart, divided into the two main regions of Flanders and Wallonia, ranks the best-performing albums in Belgium, as compiled by Ultratop.


Flanders

Wallonia

See also
List of Ultratop 50 number-one singles of 2020

References

Number one albums
Belgium Albums
Belgian record charts